2 is the second solo album by Spanish singer Amaia Montero, after an eleven-year music career as the frontwoman for La Oreja de Van Gogh and the success of her first album Amaia Montero. It was released in Spain on 8 November 2011 by Sony BMG. "Caminando" was the first single released from the album.

Track listing

Singles 
 "Caminando" - (2011)
 "Tu Mirada" - (2011)
 "¿Dónde Estabas?" - (2012)

References 

Amaia Montero albums
Spanish-language albums
Sony Music albums
2011 albums